A cyberbully is a person who engages in cyberbullying.

Cyberbully may also refer to:

Cyberbully (2011 film), an American television film
Cyberbully (2015 film), a British television film